"Psycho Holiday" is a song by the American heavy metal band Pantera, released as the third and final single from their 1990 album Cowboys from Hell. It is the third song on the album.

Background
"Psycho Holiday" is in the key of F#. Vocalist Phil Anselmo's voice ranges in pitch from G4 to F6.

Music video
A video was made for the song, released on the 1991 VHS Cowboys from Hell: The Videos. It was later re-released on the 1999 DVD 3 Vulgar Videos from Hell. The video was directed by Paul Rachman.

Reception
Malcolm Dome of Metal Hammer considered "Psycho Holiday" to be one of the ten best Pantera songs, writing that the band proved they could be melodic, nasty and musically simple but creative. Dom Lawson, also of Metal Hammer, ranked it the 26th-best Pantera song, calling it an "unhinged classic".
 
AllMusic writer Eduardo Rivadavia considered "Psycho Holiday" to be one of the three highlights from the album.

Track listing
 "Psycho Holiday" – 5:19
 "Cowboys from Hell" (live) – 4:07
 "Heresy" (live) – 4:48

In popular culture
"Psycho Holiday" was mentioned in the Cherrie Lynn book Unleashed. In the video game WWF WrestleMania 2000, the menu theme seems to emulate the song.

Personnel
Phil Anselmo – vocals
Diamond Darrell – guitar
Rex Brown – bass
Vinnie Paul – drums

References

 

1990 songs
Pantera songs
Songs written by Dimebag Darrell
Songs written by Vinnie Paul
Songs written by Phil Anselmo
Songs written by Rex Brown